Means, LLC (also known as The Means Cooperative) is an American anti-capitalist mass media worker cooperative. Means was founded in 2019 by filmmakers Naomi Burton and Nick Hayes in Detroit as an expansion of their video production company Means of Production. Means currently has two arms, a subscription streaming service offering Means TV and a video game publishing arm via Means Interactive.

History 
Before founding The Means Cooperative, Burton and Hayes both worked in commercial media production for automakers in Detroit and attended Democratic Socialists of America meetings. They began to find their work morally objectionable and left their jobs to found the video production company Means of Production. Means of Production first came to prominence after producing a viral campaign ad for Alexandria Ocasio-Cortez's 2018 election campaign.

Branches

Means TV
Means TV is a subscription-based video on demand streaming service owned and managed by The Means Cooperative. The service features films, documentaries, television series, an original news program called Means Morning News, and independent creators from YouTube and Twitch.  The cooperative raised nearly $200,000 in its crowdfunding campaign. 

The full streaming service launched February 26, 2020.

Hayes has cited the anarchist podcast Street Fight as an inspiration for his decision to create Means TV, having worked with Street Fight to record live performances in 2017 and 2019.

On Saturday, August 8, 2020 Hayes and Burton's home and office was attacked in a drive-by shooting. Nobody was hurt. According to Hayes, they are "not 100% sure it wasn't politically motivated." No further information about the identity of the shooters has come out.

Means Interactive
Means Interactive is a video game publisher and subsidiary of The Means Cooperative. The first game published by Means Interactive is Tonight We Riot, released in May 2020 and developed by Pixel Pushers Union 512, itself a worker-owned cooperative.

References

External links
 

American companies established in 2019
Internet television streaming services
Subscription video on demand services
Worker cooperatives of the United States
Internet properties established in 2019
Organizations based in Detroit
Video game publishers